Nenad Mitrović (born 21 October 1980) is a Serbian footballer, who plays as a forward for Jedinstvo Bošnjace.

References
 

1980 births
Living people
Sportspeople from Leskovac
Association football forwards
Serbian footballers
FK Zemun players
FK Obilić players
FK Voždovac players
FK Radnički Pirot players
Serbian SuperLiga players